Tashan is a 2008 Indian action comedy film written by Vijay Krishna Acharya in his directorial debut and produced by Aditya Chopra under Yash Raj Films. Starring Akshay Kumar, Saif Ali Khan and Kareena Kapoor in the lead roles with Anil Kapoor as the lead antagonist, it was released on 25 April 2008.

Plot 
Jeetendra Kumar Makwana a.k.a. Jimmy Cliff (Saif Ali Khan) is a call center executive who also teaches English. Pooja Singh (Kareena Kapoor) shows up outside his class and says she needs private tutoring. Without any hesitation, Jimmy quickly agrees as he has already fallen in love with her; he later finds out that Pooja's boss Lakhan Singh Ballebaaz a.k.a. Bhaiyyaji (Anil Kapoor) is the one who has to be tutored. As their love grows, Pooja reveals that she is only working for Bhaiyyaji to pay her debts, so she can then go to Haridwar to scatter her father's ashes. They decide to steal Bhaiyyaji's money and run away. The couple succeeds in their mission, and Jimmy asks Pooja to guard the money while he goes to the call center to tell them he is leaving.

At the call center, Jimmy learns that Bhaiyyaji is a maverick gangster who enjoys killing people and goes home to warn Pooja. Unexpectedly, Pooja has run away with all the money and she meets a bank manager to deposit the money in the bank locker. He initially disagrees but Pooja gives him a handjob and he agrees. Bhaiyyaji hires Bachchan Pandey (Akshay Kumar), a gangster, to catch Jimmy. After getting caught, Jimmy and Bachchhan head towards Haridwar to find Pooja and recover Bhaiyyaji's money. When they reach there, Pooja sees them and runs away. Unable to find Pooja there, Jimmy and Bachchan set off to find her again. While on the road, the duo got into a silly fight about the radio station and their car falls into the water.

Along with Jimmy and Bachchan, Pooja comes out of the water too; she had been hiding in their trunk the whole time. She tells them that she has hidden the money in seven different places across India. Jimmy and Pooja decide to run away with the money. The duo decides that Pooja should seduce Bachchan just like she did Jimmy. She tries to play the ploy, but discovers in the process that he is her childhood lover, and they both fall in love. After recovering all of the money, Bachchan decides to leave with it, not knowing that Jimmy has replaced the money with stones.

When Pooja realizes what Jimmy has done, she tells him the truth about Bhaiyyaji killing her father, a kindhearted gangster, to usurp his throne. Rushing to save Bachchan, Pooja and Jimmy reach Bhaiyyaji's lair with the money. Jimmy pretends to betray Pooja and slaps Bachchan. He tells Bhaiyyaji to give him his gun so that he can kill Bachchan. After getting the gun, Jimmy instead points it to Bhaiyyaji and takes him hostage. He heads towards a car with Pooja and Bachchan following him. Surrounded by Bhaiyyaji's henchmen with guns, Bhaiyyaji manages to jump out of the car and everybody begins shooting at them. After an elongated fight, Bhaiyyaji is killed by Pooja who stabs him with a knife. In the end, Jimmy opens his own call centre, where only girls work, and Bachchhan and Pooja get married.

Cast
 Anil Kapoor as Lakhan Singh Ballebaaz a.k.a. Bhaiyyaji, a dreaded gangster, Killer of Pooja's father and the main antagonist of the film
 Akshay Kumar as Bachchan Pandey, a local goon working for Bhaiyyaji, Pooja's love interest and the main protagonist of the film
 Saif Ali Khan as Jeetendra Kumar Makwana a.k.a. Jimmy Cliff, a call center executive who is brought to teach Bhaiyyaji English, later assisting Bachchan in finding Pooja and Bhaiyyaji's money
Ibrahim Ali Khan as Younger Jeetendra Kumar Makwana
 Kareena Kapoor as Pooja Singh a.k.a. Gudiya, A woman seeking revenge against Bhaiyyaji for killing her father, Bachchan's love interest
 Sanjay Mishra as Balakram, one of Bhaiyyaji's sidekick
 Yashpal Sharma as ACP Kuldeep Singh Hooda, a police officer chasing Bhaiyyaji
 Manoj Pahwa as Anand Mohan Tiwari a.k.a. Pintu, one of Bhaiyyaji's sidekick
 Rajesh Jais as Pankaj Tiwari, local theatre producer
 Sreejita De as Parvati

Production 
Pre-production began in late 2006 with Akshay Kumar being signed first, and Saif Ali Khan and Kareena Kapoor next. In early 2007, Anil Kapoor was signed on to play a negative role in the film which marks his first role as a villain. This film continued Khan's long-standing successful collaboration with Yash Raj Films. It also marked a return for 3 of its lead actors to Yash Raj Films: Kumar was previously seen in Dil To Pagal Hai (1997), whilst Kareena Kapoor and Anil Kapoor were last seen in Mujhse Dosti Karoge! (2002) and Lamhe (1991), respectively.

Apart from the major star cast, Khan's son, Ibrahim, also made his acting debut, where he played the younger version of his father's character. Sources later indicated that all the actors would be seen sporting new looks designed by designer Aki Narula. In June 2007, the cast began filming in Kerala, and later continued shooting in Ladakh and Rajasthan. Pictures of Khan and Kareena Kapoor were taken in September 2007 while shooting for the film in the Fort area of Mumbai. Some portions of the film were later shot in the city of Haridwar on the banks of the river Ganges. The video clips of two songs were made in Milos Island and Nafplio in Greece.

The first promo was shown on 30 November 2007 with the release of Anil Mehta's Aaja Nachle. In a poll conducted by indiaFM, Tashan ranked #1 on the list of "Most Awaited Movies of 2008". To promote the film, Yash Raj Films built communities on social networking sites like Facebook, Orkut and YouTube.

Music 

Released on 10 January 2008 by Yash Raj Films, Tashans soundtrack was composed by Vishal–Shekhar, whilst the lyrics were penned by 4 different lyricists: Piyush Mishra, Anvita Dutt Guptan, Vishal Dadlani and Kausar Munir. Joginder Tuteja from IndiaFM gave the film's soundtrack 4 out of 5 stars and noted, "Songs in Tashan excite, get on to you quickly and make you put them on a repeat mode". There is not a single dull moment in this entire album which has its tallest highpoints in "Dil Dance Maare", "Dil Haara" and "Falak Tak".

The soundtrack of the film debuted at #3, where it stayed the following week. On the week of the film's release, the album moved up to #1. According to the Indian trade website Box Office India, with around 15,00,000 units sold, this film's soundtrack album was the year's ninth highest-selling.

Reception

Box office
Before the release of the film, Tashan received an advance booking, which ranged from 25 to 35% tickets sold for the weekend at the major centres. On the day of its release, the film opened to a 75-80% response but well short of the expected bumper opening due to the multiplex revenue-sharing problem, which didn't allow the film to be released in major multiplexes across India. Due to this, the film lost a major chunk of its revenue and collected a total of Rs. 180 million after its first week. Although the following week, an agreement was made between Yash Raj Films and the multiplexes, which allowed the film to be screened from 3 May 2008 onwards at multiplexes across the country, the film managed to add only another Rs. 70 million to its collections and was declared below-average at the box-office.

Meanwhile, the film opened to below-average response overseas as well. During its first week, the film collected £181,838 on 46 screens and debuted at #13 in the U.K charts. In the United States, the film debuted at #24 and collected US$301,226 on 75 screens whilst in Australia, Tashan debuted at #17 and collected a total of $148,087 on 13 screens. During its second week in the overseas market, the film experienced a heavy fall and was declared below average.

Critical response 
Tashan opened to mixed reviews from critics. Most Indian critics criticized the lackluster script penned by director Vijay Krishna Acharya. Critic Taran Adarsh from indiaFM gave the film a 1.5 out of 5 rating and concluded that it was "...one of the weakest films to come out of the Yash Raj banner." Rajeev Masand from CNN-IBN described the film as "...a road movie...that is going in all the wrong directions." On the other hand, Sanjay Ram, who gave the film 3.5 stars out of 5, wrote, "The film, though with many slips, is thoroughly engaging and entertaining. The vibrancy and spunk keeps it alive and loaded."

US critics were favourable. Rachel Saltz of The New York Times wrote, "The giddy camera work and busy visual effects would be exhausting if their excess didn't fit so well with the movie's tongue-in-cheek tone". Frank Lovece of Film Journal International found it "crowded with dizzying visuals, dry humor, cartoonishly violent set-pieces that play like Indian Spaghetti Westerns, and gorgeously shot musical numbers. Maitland McDonagh of TV Guide described the film as "a delirious crime romp [that] borrows pop-savvy attitude from Quentin Tarantino, stylised gun-play from Sergio Leone and stylised hand-to-hand combat moves from Hong Kong action films. The result is a nutty, ridiculously entertaining neo-noir pastiche with lavish musical numbers."

The performances of the lead cast too received mixed reviews. Kumar and Kareena were praised for their performances, however Anil and Khan received mixed reviews for their performances. Taran Adarsh noted, "Tashan belongs to Akshay Kumar completely. No two opinions on that. Take Akshay out of this film and the movie is a big zero. He's the lifeline of this project...[whilst] Kareena Kapoor is fantastic. She looks gorgeous and acts very well." Sonia Chopra from Sify concluded, "It is Akshay and Kareena who sizzle in the film and have the best parts." Sonia Chopra explained "Anil plays the baddie to the hilt...[and] Saif...gives a strictly lukewarm performance."

References

External links
 
 
 
 
 
 
 

2008 films
2008 action comedy films
2000s comedy road movies
Indian action comedy films
2000s masala films
2000s Hindi-language films
Yash Raj Films films
Indian comedy road movies
Films shot in Uttarakhand
Films scored by Vishal–Shekhar
2008 directorial debut films
Films shot in Kanpur
Films shot in Greece
Films shot in Ladakh
Films shot in Rajasthan
Films shot in Mumbai
Films shot in Alappuzha